Lariat debranching enzyme is a protein that in humans is encoded by the DBR1 gene.

The RNA lariat debranching enzyme, or DBR1, specifically hydrolyzes 2-prime-to-5-prime branched phosphodiester bonds at the branch point of excised lariat intron RNA and converts them into linear molecules.[supplied by OMIM]

References

Further reading